Critz, de Critz (also Decritz), and Kritz is a surname. Notable people with the name include:

Critz
 Hugh Critz (1876–1939), president of Mississippi State University
 Hughie Critz (1900–1980), American baseball player
 Mark Critz (born 1962), American politician from Pennsylvania

de Critz (Decritz)
 John de Critz (1551/2–1642), Flemish painter
 Thomas de Critz (1607–1653), English painter

Kritz
 Karl Kritz (1906–1969), Austrian conductor
 Ori Kritz, Israeli language and literature professor